Donald Dean Menasco (October 18, 1929 – May 11, 1998) was an American football defensive back in the National Football League for the New York Giants and the Washington Redskins.  He played college football at the University of Texas and was drafted in the fourth round of the 1952 NFL Draft.

1929 births
1998 deaths
People from Mitchell County, Texas
American football defensive backs
Texas Longhorns football players
New York Giants players
Washington Redskins players